Acontias namaquensis, the Namaqua legless skink or Namaqua lance skink, is a species of lizard in the family Scincidae. It is endemic to Little Namaqualand, Northern Cape, South Africa.

References

Acontias
Skinks of Africa
Endemic reptiles of South Africa
Reptiles described in 1938
Taxa named by John Hewitt (herpetologist)